A Letter from Bataan is a 1942 "Victory Short" propaganda film made by Paramount Pictures in collaboration with the U.S. Office of War Information and the United States Government. It was directed by William H. Pine, produced by William C. Thomas and written by Maxwell Shane. It had music by Daniele Amfitheatrof and the cinematography was by Fred Jackman Jr.

The film features Richard Arlen, Susan Hayward, Jimmy Lydon and Betty Hutton appearing as herself.

The film is part of a series of films made by Paramount intended to encourage more active participation in the U.S. war effort.

External links

References 

American World War II propaganda films
1942 films
Paramount Pictures short films
American black-and-white films
American documentary films
1942 documentary films
Films directed by William H. Pine